SoftMaker Office is an office suite developed since 1987 by the German company SoftMaker Software GmbH based in Nuremberg.

A freeware version is released as well, under the name of SoftMaker FreeOffice.

Components 
SoftMaker Office includes:
 TextMaker, a word processor
 PlanMaker, a spreadsheet application
 SoftMaker Presentations, a presentation graphics application
 BasicMaker, a VBA-like programming tool (Windows only)
SoftMaker Office Professional and SoftMaker Office NX Universal additionally include:
 A Duden spell checker and grammar checker,
 Two Duden dictionaries,
 EPUB export
 Zotero integration
 Support for Windows Group Policy

Functionality 
SoftMaker Office has similar functionality to other office suites such as Microsoft Office or LibreOffice, and can also run from USB flash drives and supports integrated reference works. Multi-language spell-checking, hyphenation and thesaurus is supported, and it has an integrated five-language translation dictionary (English, German, French, Italian, and Spanish).

It has its own native formats, and can read and write file formats of Microsoft Office, OpenDocument format (word processor only), RTF and HTML. Support for the OpenDocument spreadsheet (ODS) format was added in the Anniversary update released for SoftMaker Office 2018. It can export to PDF and EPUB.

The user interface is similar to the Ribbon utilized in Microsoft Office 2007 and later, and there is an option to use menus and toolbars instead of the Ribbon. A dark mode is available. Documents can be opened as tabs in a single window, to allow easy switching between multiple documents.

SoftMaker Office is also available for Android smartphones and tablets. It includes TextMaker, PlanMaker, and Presentations. These apps offer the full feature set of a desktop office suite with word processing, spreadsheets and presentation graphics on mobile devices.

See also 
 Comparison of office suites

References

External links 
 SoftMaker Software
 SoftMaker FreeOffice (official site with info & downloads)
 SoftMaker Office 2021 (North America distributor)
 Alternative2office.org (North America download site)

Office suites
Office suites for Linux
Office suites for Windows
Pocket PC software
Proprietary software